Mustaf Mohamed Yuusuf (born 1 January 1998) is a Somali footballer who plays as a goalkeeper for Oskarshamns AIK and the Somalia national team.

Club career 
Yuusuf began his career in Somalia, playing for Midnimo, Jeenyo United and Heegan. In 2020, Yuusuf moved to Sweden, signing for fifth tier club Nybro IF. In 2021, Yuusuf signed for Oskarshamns AIK.

International career 
On 9 October 2015, Yuusuf made his debut for Somalia, in a 2–0 World Cup qualification loss against Niger.

References 

1998 births
Living people
People from Burao
Association football goalkeepers
Oskarshamns AIK players
Ettan Fotboll players
Division 3 (Swedish football) players
Somalian footballers
Somalia international footballers
Somalian expatriate footballers